Live at Laren is a live album by American jazz saxophonist Lee Konitz's Nonet recorded in 1979 by Dutch Broadcasting, NOS -Hilversum and released on the Italian Soul Note label in 1984.

Critical reception

Ken Dryden on Allmusic called it: "One of the less familiar releases in Lee Konitz's extensive discography".

Track listing 
 "April" (Lennie Tristano) - 7:03
 "Who You" (Jimmy Knepper) - 6:15
 "Without a Song" (Vincent Youmans, Billy Rose, Edward Eliscu) - 9:32
 "Moon Dreams" (Chummy MacGregor, Johnny Mercer) - 3:45
 "Times Lie" (Chick Corea) - 10:54
 "Matrix" (Corea) - 13:38

Personnel 
Lee Konitz – alto saxophone, soprano saxophone
Red Rodney – trumpet, flugelhorn
John Eckert - trumpet, flugelhorn, piccolo trumpet
Jimmy Knepper – trombone
Sam Burtis – bass trombone, tuba
Ronnie Cuber – baritone saxophone, clarinet
Ben Aranov – piano 
Ray Drummond – bass
Billy Hart – drums

References 

Lee Konitz live albums
1984 live albums
Black Saint/Soul Note live albums